Combined Task Force 151 (CTF-151) is a multinational naval task force, set up in 2009 as a response to piracy attacks in the Gulf of Aden and off the eastern coast of Somalia.  Its mission is to disrupt piracy and armed robbery at sea and to engage with regional and other partners to build capacity and improve relevant capabilities in order to protect global maritime commerce and secure freedom of navigation. It operates in conjunction with the EU's Operation Atalanta and NATO's Operation Ocean Shield.

As of June 2021, the commander of CTF-151 is the Rear Admiral André Luiz Andrade Felix, of the Brazilian Navy.

History
The CTF 151 was established on 12 January 2009 as a response to piracy attacks in Somalia, "with a specific piracy mission-based mandate under the authority of UNSCRs 1816, 1838, 1846, 1851 and 1897". The CTF 150 mainly dealt with maritime security and counter terrorism. Piracy was considered more of a law enforcement mission. CTF were established as a mission-based Task Force. Upon their establishment in 2009, operated under a UNSCR counter-piracy mandate. The CTF is not geographically constrained. Their mandate has been "based upon the range of counter-piracy UNSCRs". In February 2011, a group of pirates hijacked a Panamanian-flagged ship. The Puntland government stated that they did not want captured ships and pirate bases near Bosaso. The pirates forced the ship's crew to the south, to a coastal area that was not as receptive. Admiral Mcknight had a conversation with Jatin Dua and the Navy SEALS rescued two hostages who were being held in an inland camp. The SEALS killed about nine pirates.

In January 2012, six Somali pirates launched an attack on the bulk cargo ship the MV Sunshine about one hundred miles off the coast of Oman. This was referred to as a by-the-book approach; The pirates used AK-47s, a rocket propelled grenade launcher, a grappling hook and attempted to affix a ladder onto the boat. The pirates threw their weapons overboard so the boarding team could not arrest them. They gave the pirates food and water, finally turning them loose. The Somalis did not realize that a helicopter from the USS Mobile Bay was keeping track of their movements. The pirates headed back to the Iranian dhow. The USS Kidd was able to track the Al Mulahi and noticed some Middle Easterners were aboard. The New York Times reported a standoff, afterwards the Somalis were still hidden and the Iranian captain spoke with the Americans.

Formation
Between 2002 and 2004, a first naval coalition in charge of fighting terrorism in the area was dubbed Task Force 151.

On 8 January 2009, at the United States Fifth Fleet headquarters in Manama, Bahrain, Vice Admiral William E. Gortney, USN, announced the formation of CTF-151 to combat the piracy threat off Somalia, with Rear Admiral Terence E. McKnight in command.  The  was designated as the first flagship of Combined Task Force 151, serving as an afloat forward staging base (AFSB) for the following force elements:

 Fourteen-member U.S. Navy visit, board, search and seizure (VBSS) team.
 One of the United States Coast Guard eight-member Law Enforcement Detachments (LEDETs): Law Enforcement Detachment 405.
 3rd Platoon (Golf Company, 26th MEU), a military police detachment, and intelligence personnel.
 Fleet Surgical Team 8 with level-two surgical capability to deal with trauma, surgical, critical care and medical evacuation needs.
 Approximately 75 Marines with six AH-1 SuperCobra (AH-1Ws) and two UH-1N Huey helicopters from Marine Medium Helicopter Squadron 264 (HMM-264) of the 26th MEU cross-decked from the USS Iwo Jima.

Twenty countries were expected to contribute to the force, including Canada, Denmark, France, Japan, Republic of Korea, the Netherlands, Pakistan, Singapore, Thailand and the United Kingdom, all of which have already pledged participation.

On 5 April 2009, United States Rear Admiral Michelle J. Howard, assumed command of CTF-151 and Expeditionary Strike Group 2. On 29 May, the Australian Government pledged its support, re-tasking the frigate  from duties in the Persian Gulf to the task force, as well as Lockheed P-3 Orion maritime patrol aircraft.

Task measures
The measures carried out by the task force include: Upholding an active 24-hour lookout, the removal of access ladders, reporting apprehensive actions to proper authorities, the use of deck lighting, razor wire, netting, fire hoses, electrical fencing, and surveillance and detection equipment, defending the lowest points of access, engaging in evasive maneuvering and speed through pirate attacks, and joining group transits.

The CMF established the Maritime Security Patrol Area (MSPA) in the Gulf of Aden in August 2008 to provision international efforts to battle piracy. The coalition efforts involved CTF-150 assets patrolling the area with aircraft and ships. However, the charter for CTF-150, which was established at the beginning of Operation Enduring Freedom, was for the conduct of Maritime Security Operations in the Gulf of Oman, Gulf of Aden, the Arabian Sea, the Indian Ocean and the Red Sea. Such operations included the deterrence of threatening activities, such as weapons trafficking and drug smuggling.

Rescue of Captain Richard Phillips
In 2009, there was a pirate attack on the Maersk Alabama. The rescue personnel included DEVGRU. On 7 April 2009 there was an advisory issued by the U.S. Maritime Administration stating that ships stay six hundred miles off the coast of Somalia due to an increase of piracy. The Somali pirates mainly targeted the Gulf of Aden because most vessels traveling towards the Suez Canal were there. However, with CTF 151, the Chinese, Russians, and Operation Atalanta all concentrated in that area, pirates were compelled to look elsewhere. On 1 April 2009 the Maersk Alabama headed toward the Gulf of Aden. Captain Phillips was unaware of the pirates on the way . Captain Phillips and his crew were eventually surrounded by three pirate skiffs with their mother ship in pursuit, eight miles behind. Phillips eventually hit the silent alarm button that signaled a search and rescue team to come. At one point it was reported that there was a standoff between the ship's crew and the pirates. They eventually called for a prisoner exchange and Phillips was among the first to be released onto a lifeboat.

Success
Vice Admiral Bill Gortney stated that because of proactive measures taken by certain merchant mariners, the piracy events in the region have been reduced. He also cautioned that the "efforts of coalition and international navies won't solve the problem of piracy."

List of Commanders
  Commodore Roger Girouard, RCN as Task Force 151
  Rear Admiral Terence E. McKnight, USN
  Rear Admiral Scott Eugene Sanders, USN
  Rear Admiral Caner Bener, TN
  Rear Admiral Bernard Miranda, RSN
  Rear Admiral Lee Beom-rim, ROKN
  Rear Admiral Sinan Ertuğrul, TN
  Commodore Abdul Aleem, PN
  Rear Admiral Harris Chan Weng Yip, RSN
  Captain Jim Gilmour, RNZN
  Rear Admiral Kaleem Shaukat, PN
  Commodore Aage Buur Jensen, Danish Navy
  Rear Admiral Tanin Likitawong, RTN
  Rear Admiral Anho Chung, ROKN
  Rear Admiral Oguz Karaman, TN
  Commodore Muhammad Hisham, PN
  Rear Admiral Giam Hock Koon, RSN
  Commodore Muhammad Ihsan Qadir, PN
  Commodore Jeremy Blunden LVO, RN
  Commodore Aage Buur Jensen, Danish Navy 2nd Term
  Commodore Ali Abbas SI(M), PN
  Rear Admiral Cho Young Joo, ROKN
  Commodore Tony Millar, MNZM, RNZN
  Rear Admiral Pakorn Wanich, RTN
  Commodore Asif Hameed Siddiqui, PN
  Rear Admiral Hiroshi Ito, JMSDF
  Captain Ayhan Bay, TN
  Rear Admiral Zahid Ilyas, PN
  Rear Admiral Cheong Kwok Chien, RSN
  Rear Admiral Nam Dong Woo, ROKN
  Commodore Muhammad Shuaib SI (M), Pakistan Navy
  Rear Admiral Tatsuya Fukuda, JMSDF
  Rear Admiral Emre Sezenler, TN
  Commodore Yusuf Almannaei, RBNF
  Rear Admiral Daisuke Kajimoto, JMSDF
  Rear Admiral Saw Shi Tat, RSN
  Captain Ali Al Rashidi, Kuwait Naval Force
  Captain Alajmi, Kuwait Naval Force
  Rear Admiral Byeong-Ju Yu, ROKN
  Captain Khaled Hasan Al Kandari, Kuwait Naval Force
  Rear Admiral Yoshiyasu Ishimaki, JMSDF
  Rear Admiral Nejat Inanir, TN 
  Commodore Abdul Munib, Pakistan Navy
  Rear Admiral André Luiz Andrade Felix, Brazilian Navy (Current)

Command History 
The Task Force has been headed by different countries participating.

See also
 Operation Atalanta—EU operation in the area
 Operation Ocean Shield—NATO operation in the area
 Combined Task Force 150—similar patrol in the Indian Ocean that deals with counter-terrorism
 Maritime Security Patrol Area
 Maersk Alabama hijacking in April 2009

References

Further reading
 McKnight, Terry and Michael Hirsh. Pirate Alley: Commanding Task Force 151 off Somalia. Annapolis, MD : Naval Institute Press, 2012.  
 Newsome, Timothy E. Somali Piracy: Are We Making a Mountain Out of a Molehill? Ft. Belvoir: Defense Technical Information Center, 2009.  
 Phillips, Richard, and Stephan Talty. A Captain's Duty: Somali Pirates, Navy Seals, and Dangerous Days at Sea. New York: Hyperion, 2010.   
 Zogg, Dennis M. Why the U.S. Navy Should Not Be Fighting Piracy Off Somalia. Ft. Belvoir: Defense Technical Information Center, 2009.

External links

U.S. Navy Hunt for Somali Pirates: Behind the Pirate Code
CENTCOM: New Counter-Piracy Task Force Established
Navy creates force devoted to fighting piracy
CTF-151: Counter-piracy
Multinational Task Force Targets Pirates 
Arms and Influence at Sea
Tag Archive: CTF-151
Combined Maritime Forces (CMF)Operations Counter Piracy Operations, Challenges, Shortfalls and Lessons Learned
New Counter-Piracy Task Force Established
Counter-piracy Mission Off Somalia Remains Problematic
The United States Response to Piracy off the Coast of Somalia
Combined Task Force 151 hunts down pirates in the Gulf of Aden

Multinational units and formations
Naval operations involving Pakistan
Naval task forces
Piracy in Somalia
Military units and formations established in 2009
Anti-piracy